The Jamestown Jimmies program is a college football team that represents Jamestown College in the Dakota Athletic Conference, a part of the NAIA.  The team has had 16 head coaches since its first recorded football game in 1914. The current coach is Brian Mistro who was hired in January 2019.

Key

Coaches

Notes

References

Lists of college football head coaches

North Dakota sports-related lists